Edou is a small town in Oyo District in the Cuvette Department of the Republic of Congo.

The current President, Denis Sassou-Nguesso, was born in Edou in 1943 as was politician François Ibovi in 1954.

References

Populated places in the Republic of the Congo
Cuvette Department